Nuclear Measurements Corporation (NMC) is a privately held company based in Indianapolis, Indiana.  It is a maker of instrumentation for the nuclear industry.

History

NMC was founded in the early 1950s.  Their analog products included Geiger counters, gamma and neutron detectors, survey meters, and soil analyzers. Some are now considered museum pieces.

After going digital in the early 1980s, its flagship product became the PIOPS ("Programmable Input Output System"), a portable cart unit with embedded systems used to measure air samples for  radioactive gases and particulate matter.

See also

 Nuclear engineering
 Radiation
 Environmental science

References

External links
 Nuclear Measurements Corporation website
 NMC's Model CD V-700 Survey Meter
 NMC's U.S. Patents

Privately held companies based in Indiana
Energy companies of the United States
Companies based in Indianapolis